Robert Cuddon (died 1462), of Dunwich, Suffolk, was an English politician.

Family
Cuddon was the son of MP, Peter Cuddon.

Career
He was a Member (MP) of the Parliament of England for Dunwich in May 1421, 1426, 1442 and 1450.

References

Year of birth missing
1462 deaths
English MPs May 1421
People from Dunwich
English MPs 1426
English MPs 1442
English MPs 1450